Petersburgh is a town located in the northeast section of Rensselaer County, New York, United States.  The population was 1,525 at the 2010 census. The town was named after an early settler named Peter Simmons.

History 
The area was settled around the middle of the 18th century and was part of the Manor of Rensselaerswyck. The town was created in 1791 from the Town of Stephentown. The size of this town was diminished by the formation of other towns in the county, including the Towns of Berlin and Lansingburgh in 1806, and Grafton and Nassau in 1807.

The Petersburgh United Methodist Church was listed on the National Register of Historic Places in 2004.

Geography 
To the east, the town borders on the states of Massachusetts and Vermont.

The Taconic Mountains cover a large portion of the town, and the Little Hoosick River joins the Hoosic River in the northern part of the town.

Demographics 

As of the census of 2000, there were 1,563 people, 587 households, and 433 families residing in the town.  The population density was 37.6 people per square mile (14.5/km2). There were 695 housing units at an average density of 16.7 per square mile (6.5/km2). The racial makeup of the town was 98.08% White, 0.19% African American, 0.06% Native American, 0.90% Asian, 0.19% from other races, and 0.58% from two or more races. Hispanic or Latino of any race were 0.45% of the population.

There were 587 households, out of which 33.9% had children under the age of 18 living with them, 62.9% were married couples living together, 7.2% had a female householder with no husband present, and 26.1% were non-families. 21.1% of all households were made up of individuals, and 7.8% had someone living alone who was 65 years of age or older. The average household size was 2.66 and the average family size was 3.07.

In the town, the population was spread out, with 26.2% under the age of 18, 6.5% from 18 to 24, 28.3% from 25 to 44, 26.4% from 45 to 64, and 12.5% who were 65 years of age or older. The median age was 39 years. For every 100 females, there were 103.3 males. For every 100 females age 18 and over, there were 99.3 males.

The median income for a household in the town was $45,909, and the median income for a family was $49,125. Males had a median income of $35,500 versus $25,208 for females.  The per capita income for the town was $21,249. About 9.8% of families and 12.3% of the population were below the poverty line, including 16.8% of those under age 18 and 10.3% of those age 65 or over.

Communities and locations 
 North Petersburgh – A hamlet in the northern part of the town on Routes 22 and 346. The Steller Homestead is found at the intersection of Route 22 and Rabbit College Road. The U.S. Postal Service treats the name as unacceptable in mailing addresses, preferring "Petersburg".
 Petersburgh (or Petersburg) – A hamlet on Routes 2 and 22, including the town hall. It was formerly called "South Petersburg" and "Rensselaer Mills", and USPS prefers the Petersburg spelling.
The following hamlets are not officially recognized by USPS:
 Petersburgh Junction – By the northern town line.
 Stillman – Northwest of Petersburgh village on Route 2.

Notable person
 Lydia Baxter (1809–1874), poet

References
Notes

Further reading

External links

 Official website
 History of Petersburgh, NY

Towns in Rensselaer County, New York